Ablett is a surname. Notable people with the surname include:

 Alfred Ablett (1830–1897), English recipient of the Victoria Cross
 Leslie Ablett (1904–1952), British water polo player
 Carl Ablett (born 1985), English rugby league player
 Gary Ablett Sr. (born 1961), Australian footballer
 Gary Ablett (1965–2012), English footballer
 Gary Ablett Jr. (born 1984), Australian footballer
 Geoff Ablett (born 1955), Australian footballer
 Kevin Ablett (born 1958), Australian footballer
 Len Ablett (1916–2006), Australian footballer
 Luke Ablett (born 1982), Australian footballer
 Nathan Ablett (born 1985), Australian footballer
 Ablett family, family of Australian rules footballers
 Noah Ablett (1883–1935), Welsh trade unionist and political theorist

References